Kenneth Davenport (February 20, 1879 – November 10, 1941), was an American film actor and screenwriter. He appeared in 9 films in  1915 and wrote two novels.

He was born in Missouri and died in Los Angeles, California.

Selected filmography
 The Nut (1921)
 Robin Hood (1922)

External links

1879 births
1941 deaths
Male actors from Missouri
American male film actors
American male screenwriters
20th-century American male actors
People from Macon, Missouri
Screenwriters from Missouri
20th-century American male writers
20th-century American screenwriters